Tyler Styer (born 1 January 1995) is an American professional pool player from Vernon, Wisconsin. Styer represented the United States at the 2018 Mosconi Cup and the 2019 Mosconi Cup. Styer was the winner of the 2019 Kremlin World Cup, defeating David Alcaide in the final.

Styer began playing pool in 2009, aged 14, before reaching 13th position at the 2013 WPA World Nine-ball Junior Championship.

Career titles
 2021 Arcadia Virtual Ghost Battle of the Sexes
 2019 Mosconi Cup
 2019 ABN Dream Challenge Team USA vs. Russia 
 2019 Kremlin Cup 
 2018 Mosconi Cup
 2018 ABN Dream Challenge Team USA vs. Russia

References

External links

American pool players
1995 births
Living people
People from Vernon, Wisconsin
20th-century American people
21st-century American people
Competitors at the 2022 World Games